Jaros is a surname. Notable people with the surname include:

Alois Jaros (1930–2007), Austrian footballer
François Jaros (born 1985), Canadian film and television director
Jarosław Jaros (born 1978), Polish cabaret actor
Mike Jaros (born 1944), American politician
Patrik Jaros (born 1967), German chef
Ralf Jaros (born 1965), German triple jumper
Stanisław Jaros (1932–1963), Polish assassin
Tony Jaros (1920–1995), American basketball player

See also
 
 Jarosz, Jarosch, Yarosh, related surnames

Czech-language surnames
Polish-language surnames
Slovak-language surnames